Within the Orchidaceae, Hormidium was originally a subgenus of the genus Epidendrum, but was later raised to a full genus. It is now considered not to be distinct from the genus Prosthechea, of which it is a synonym. Most of the species of Hormidium have been transferred to Prosthechea, although others are now classified in Encyclia, Epidendrum, Homalopetalum, and Lepanthes.

Taxonomy 
In 1841, John Lindley used the name Hormidium for one of the subgenera into which he divided the genus Epidendrum. He described the subgenus as having pseudobulbous stems, sessile flowers and with the lip (labellum) of the flower joined (adnate) to the column. Later, in 1861, Heinrich Reichenbach concluded that the subgenus Hormidium was superfluous.

In 1883, George Bentham and Joseph Hooker raised Hormidium to a full genus. They distinguished Hormidium from the other pseudobulbous species of Epidendrum with at least a partially adnate labellum, and specifically mentioned only four species, two of which are now retained in Epidendrum, one which is now placed in Homalopetalum, and one which is now placed in Lepanthes.  Because the genus Encyclia features non-adnate labella, and because the genus Prosthechea features labella which are only partially adnate (and therefore do not quite meet Lindley's criteria for Hormidium), Bentham and Hooker's description is useful:

"The plant is a small epiphyte.  The pseudobulbs and rhizome are covered with membranaceous sheathes. The pseudobulb bears one or two small leathery or fleshy leaves. The flowers are small (or larger, in the case of Hormidium sophronitis), born on a short raceme.  The floral bracts are small. The sepals are of equal lengths, partially closed or completely open, the dorsal sepal free at the rear and the lateral sepals adnate to the base of the column forming a small "ladle".  The petals are similar to the sepals or very narrow. The labellum is adnate to the column to its apex with completely erect lamina, either trilobate or lacking any divisions.  The column is short with a dilated margin.  The clinandrium is short and truncated. The terminal, operculate, slightly kidney-shaped anther leans against the column and carries four pollinia.  The flattened egg-shaped pollinia are distinct from each other."

Hormidium is now considered not to be distinct from the genus Prosthechea, of which it is a synonym. Most, but not all, of the former species of Hormidium have been transferred to Prosthechea.

Species and synonymy
The following species have at one time or another been placed in the genus Hormidium but are now placed in different genera:

H. almasii (Hoehne) Brieger = Prosthechea glumacea
H. baculibulbum (Schltr.) Brieger = Prosthechea vespa
H. boothianum (Lindl.) Brieger = Prosthechea boothiana
H. brassavolae (Rchb. f.) Brieger = Prosthechea brassavolae
H. caetense Bicalho = Prosthechea caetensis
H. calamarium (Lindl.) Brieger = Prosthechea calamaria
H. coriaceum  Brieger = Prosthechea vespa
H. faresianum Bicalho = Prosthechea faresiana
H. faustum (Rchb.f. ex Cogn.) Brieger = Prosthechea fausta
H. gilbertoi (Garay) P.Ortiz = Prosthechea gilbertoi
H. glumaceum (Lindl.) Brieger = Prosthechea glumacea
H. guttatum (A. Rich. & Galeotti) Brieger = Prosthechea guttata
H. hioramii Acuna & Roíg = Prosthechea pygmaea
H. humile (Cogn.) Schltr. = Prosthechea pygmaea
H. ionocentrum  (Rchb. f.) Brieger  = Prosthechea ionocentra
H. leochilus (Rchb.f.) B.D.Jacks. = Homalopetalum leochilus
H. miserum (Lindl.) Benth. & Hook.f. ex Hemsl. = Epidendrum miserum
H. pseudopygmaeum Finet = Prosthechea pygmaea
H. pulchellum (Sw.) Benth. & Hook.f. ex B.D.Jacks. = Lepanthes pulchella
H. pygmaeum (Hook.) Benth. & Hook.f. ex Hemsl. = Prosthechea pygmaea
H. racemiferum (Dressler) Withner & P.A.Harding = Prosthechea racemifera
H. rhynchophorum (A.Rich. & Galeotti) Withner & P.A.Harding = Prosthechea rhynchophora
H. serpens (Lindl.) Benth. & Hook.f. = Epidendrum serpens
H. sessiliflorum Pabst, Moutinho & A.V.Pinto = Prosthechea sessiliflora
H. sophronitis (Linden & Rchb.f.) Benth. & Hook.f. = Epidendrum sophronitis
H. tripterum (Brongn.) Cogn. = Prosthechea pygmaea
H. uniflorum (Lindl.) Heynh. = Prosthechea pygmaea
H. variegatum  Brieger = Prosthechea vespa
H. virens  Brieger = Encyclia diurna
H. widgrenii (Lindl.) Brieger = Prosthechea widgrenii

References 

Epidendreae
 *
Prosthechea
Encyclia
Lepanthes
Historically recognized angiosperm genera